The Justice Society of America is a team of comic book superheroes published by DC Comics. The JSA members are listed here only once—in order of their first joining the team. Retconned members are listed only where they historically took part in the stories.

Note: In the wake of DC Comics' Flashpoint event, the history of the JSA was rebooted. Many of the characters were reintroduced with new histories while others were erased from existence. Their history was later restored (with minor changes) by the events of Doomsday Clock. Characters' last known status is listed below. An alternate version of the team appears in the New 52 series Earth-2.

Golden Age members

Guests in Justice League of America / Silver Age additions

Return to All-Star Comics/ Bronze Age additions

Post-Crisis on Infinite Earths additions

JSA additions

Justice Society of America (vol. 3) additions

Trinity additions

JSA All-Stars (vol. 2) additions

DC Rebirth - Present

Members of the World Army of Earth-2
An alternate version of the JSA appears in the New 52 comics series Earth 2, set on another world of the Multiverse.

In other media

DC Animated Universe

Smallville

The Brave and the Bold

DC Universe Animated Original Movies

Young Justice

Arrowverse

Pre-Crisis members
A television adaptation of the JSA appears in the TV shows set in the Arrowverse. Members first appeared in Legends of Tomorrow. This version of the team was present in the Pre-Crisis continuity of Arrowverse Earth-1. It is currently unknown if they continue to exist on Earth-1 in the Post-Crisis continuity.

Post-Crisis members
A second version of the team appears in the Post-Crisis continuity of Arrowverse Earth-2. In this continuity, most of the JSA were wiped out by the Injustice Society 10 years prior to the start of Stargirl. Starman, shortly before his death, passes the Cosmic Staff to Pat Dugan for safekeeping in hopes that one day he can find someone who can use the Cosmic Staff and restart the JSA.

10 years later, Pat's Stepdaughter Courtney Whitmore discovers the Cosmic Staff in the basement of their new home in Blue Valley, Nebraska, and is able to activate it. Courtney later takes the name Stargirl. After stealing the costumes and equipment of the former Justice Society, she gives the costumes and equipment to, and recruits her fellow High School students Yolanda Montez, Beth Chapel, and Rick Tyler to join her and Pat in the formation of a new Justice Society.

Injustice

DC Extended Universe

Tomorrowverse

References

Justice Society members
Justice Society of America